Jürgenshagen is a municipality  in the Rostock district of Mecklenburg-Vorpommern, Germany.

References